The Lady and the Duke is a 2001 historical romantic drama film written and directed by Éric Rohmer, based on the memoirs Ma vie sous la révolution (Journal of My Life During the French Revolution) by Grace Elliott, a Scottish royalist caught up in the political intrigue following the French Revolution.

According to a description of the film in The Guardian, Rohmer's "customary verbal sparring and complex intellectual arguments are spiced by lavish sets, suspenseful plotting and the continuous threat of violence."

Cast

Reception
The film was criticised by many viewers in France because of its uncompromising presentation of revolutionary violence; some described it as reactionary or monarchist propaganda. Asked about this, Lucy Russell remarked: "There does seem to be a great problem, not just in France, but every country has problems facing up to the nasty parts of its history. But there's a reason it was called the Terror."

References

External links
 
 
 
 
 

2000s French films
2000s German films
2001 films
2001 biographical drama films
2001 romantic drama films
2000s French-language films
2000s historical drama films
2000s historical romance films
Couples
Cultural depictions of Maximilien Robespierre
Films based on memoirs
Films directed by Éric Rohmer
Films set in the 1790s
Films set in Paris
Films shot in Île-de-France
French biographical drama films
French historical drama films
French historical romance films
French Revolution films
French romantic drama films
German biographical drama films
German historical drama films
German historical romance films
German romantic drama films
Pathé films
Sony Pictures Classics films